The Men's Boxing Tournament at the 1987 Pan American Games was held in the Indiana Convention Center in Indianapolis, United States from August 8 to August 23.

Clash between Cuban athletes and anti-Castro protestors 
Tension between Cuba and the United States had already been an issue with the selection of Indianapolis over Havana for the site of the games, and a Cuban boycott had been avoided only when Fidel Castro received a promise that the 1991 Pan American Games would be held in Havana. After the incident with a plane flying a banner urging Cuban athletes to defect in the opening ceremony, Cuban immigrants to the United States continued to use the games as a way to confront the Castro regime, using the Cuban athletes as a proxy. This games marked the first time since the Cuban Revolution that Cuban athletes had participated in the United States. During boxing events at the Indiana Convention Center, anti-Castro Cuban-American protestors mocked the Cuban boxers from the stands. The police were unable to stop the Cuban boxers from entering the stands and punching the protestors in retaliation. According to witnesses, up to a dozen Cuban boxers, including Pablo Romero, as well as a hundred spectators were involved. Two people were hospitalized. After these incidents Manuel Gonzalez Guerra, who was Cuba's top sports official, publicly demanded that organizers keep the anti-Castro protestors away from the Cuban athletes. In private, he also unsuccessfully asked the Indianapolis police chief to lock the activists up. Mark Miles, the president of the organizing committee, made a phone call to the Ronald Reagan administration in the White House, who subsequently pressed Cuban-American activists groups to dial down the pressure by the final week.

Medal winners

Medal table

See also
Boxing at the 1988 Summer Olympics

References

External links
Amateur Boxing

P
Boxing at the Pan American Games
Events at the 1987 Pan American Games
International boxing competitions hosted by the United States
Boxing in Indiana